American Dream is the first EP by American metalcore band Woe, Is Me. It was released on August 20, 2013, through Rise Records, produced by Tom Denney, and mixed and mastered by Cameron Mizell. Although released digitally through all major outlets, a physical version of the EP was made available solely through Best Buy stores.  It is the band's first and only release not to feature founding member Austin Thornton on drums, until their reunion in 2022.

Track listing

Personnel
Doriano Magliano - unclean vocals, additional clean vocals
Hance Alligood - clean vocals, additional unclean vocals
Andrew Paiano - rhythm guitar
Kevin Hanson - lead guitar
Brian Medley - bass guitar
David Angle - drums

References

2013 EPs
Woe, Is Me albums
Rise Records EPs
Albums produced by Tom Denney